, there were about 6,000 electric vehicles in Maine. , 2.4% of new vehicles sold in the state were electric.

Government policy
, the state government offers tax rebates of $2,000 for electric vehicle purchases, and $1,000 for plug-in hybrid vehicle purchases.

Charging stations
, there were 265 charging stations in Maine.

Manufacturing
Maine contains a large number of deposits of lithium, a key component of electric vehicle batteries, including the largest deposit in the country in Newry. These deposits have led Maine to be proposed as a hub for mining lithium for use in batteries.

By region

Portland
, there were 250 public charging stations in Portland.

References

Maine
Road transportation in Maine